Frederick Buckle (25 September 1849 – 7 November 1884) was an English cricketer. He played fifteen first-class matches for Surrey between 1867 and 1872.

See also
 List of Surrey County Cricket Club players

References

External links
 

1849 births
1884 deaths
Cricketers from Thames Ditton
English cricketers
Surrey cricketers